William Henry Bancroft (August 25, 1904 – December 6, 1993) was an American college football, basketball and baseball coach. He served as the head football coach at Howard College—now known as Samford University—from 1935 to 1939. Bancroft died on December 6, 1993, in Birmingham, Alabama.

Head coaching record

College football

References

External links
 
 

1904 births
1993 deaths
Baseball second basemen
Baseball third basemen
Birmingham Barons players
Gadsden Pilots players
Montgomery Lions players
Oklahoma City Indians players
Samford Bulldogs baseball coaches
Samford Bulldogs football coaches
Samford Bulldogs football players
Samford Bulldogs men's basketball coaches
Selma Cloverleafs players
Spartanburg Spartans players
High school baseball coaches in the United States
High school football coaches in Alabama
People from Livingston, Alabama
Coaches of American football from Alabama
Players of American football from Alabama
Baseball coaches from Alabama
Baseball players from Alabama
Basketball coaches from Alabama